Egerin is a web search engine. It is the first search engine in Kurdish language and is focused to provide fully functional search and blog system, including videos, image, and news for the Kurds.

The Concept
Egerin was founded by Kawa Onatli, a Kurdish businessman who lives in Sweden. Onatli wanted to provide an alternative to the big search engines that do not have the Kurdish language available, targeting a wide audience of between 26 and 34 million Kurds.

Technology

The search technology used is Solr with the rest of the technology stack being PostgreSQL, Scrapy and Python_(programming_language) web frameworks.

See also 
List of search engines

References

External links
 

Internet search engines